Ecuador national basketball team is the national men's basketball team from Ecuador who played in the 1950 FIBA World Championship where they came eighth.

FIBA World Cup
 1950: 7th place

Pan American Games
 1951: 9th place

Current roster
At the 2016 South American Basketball Championship:

|}

| valign="top" |

Head coach

Assistant coaches

Legend

Club – describes lastclub before the tournament
Age – describes ageon 26 June 2016

|}

References

External links
Latinbasket.com - Ecuador Men National Team

Men's national basketball teams
Basketball in Ecuador
1950 establishments in Ecuador
National sports teams of Ecuador